The Morgan High School Mechanical Arts Building, at 20 N. One Hundred E in Morgan, Utah, was built in 1936.  It was listed on the National Register of Historic Places in 1986.

It is Art Deco in style, and was probably designed by Salt Lake City architects Scott & Welch.  It is a one-story brick building with a gable roof surrounded by a parapet wall.  Its walls are divided into panels by pilasters which have "stylized geometric capitals" made of concrete" which "project upward through the coping at the edge of the roof, giving the building a crenelated appearance."

There are currently five mechanical arts buildings listed on the National Register in Utah.  The other four are:
Moroni High School Mechanical Arts Building (1935-36), Moroni, Utah
Mount Pleasant High School Mechanical Arts Building (1935-36), Mount Pleasant, Utah
Park City High School Mechanical Arts Building (1935-36), Park City, Utah
Springville High School Mechanical Arts Building (1929), Springville, Utah

See also 

 Morgan High School (Utah)

References

		
National Register of Historic Places in Morgan County, Utah
Art Deco architecture in Utah
Buildings and structures completed in 1936
1936 establishments in Utah